Tegostoma marginalis is a moth in the family Crambidae. It was described by Hans Georg Amsel in 1961 and is found in Iran.

References

Odontiini
Moths described in 1961
Moths of Asia
Taxa named by Hans Georg Amsel